Brady Township is one of the twelve townships of Williams County, Ohio, United States.  The 2000 census found 2,822 people in the township, 1,032 of whom lived in the unincorporated portions of the township.

Geography
Located in the eastern part of the county, it borders the following townships:
Mill Creek Township - north
Franklin Township, Fulton County - northeast
German Township, Fulton County - east
Springfield Township - south
Pulaski Township - southwest corner
Jefferson Township - west

The village of West Unity is located in central Brady Township.

Name and history
Brady Township bears the name of one Captain Brady, a pioneer settler. It is the only Brady Township statewide. The first settlement at Brady Township was made in 1834.

Government
The township is governed by a three-member board of trustees, who are elected in November of odd-numbered years to a four-year term beginning on the following January 1. Two are elected in the year after the presidential election and one is elected in the year before it. There is also an elected township clerk, who serves a four-year term beginning on April 1 of the year after the election, which is held in November of the year before the presidential election. Vacancies in the clerkship or on the board of trustees are filled by the remaining trustees.

References

External links
County website

Townships in Williams County, Ohio
Townships in Ohio